Thrasymachus (Thrasýmachos; c. 459 – c. 400 BC) was a sophist of ancient Greece best known as a character in Plato's Republic.

Life, date, and career
Thrasymachus was a citizen of Chalcedon, on the Bosphorus.  His career appears to have been spent as a sophist at Athens, although the exact nature of his work and thought is unclear.  He is credited with an increase in the rhythmic character of Greek oratory, especially the use of the paeonic rhythm in prose, and a greater appeal to the emotions through gesture.

Aristophanes makes what is the most precisely dateable of references to Thrasymachus, in a passing joke from a lost play dated to 427 BC. Nils Rauhut of the Internet Encyclopedia of Philosophy concludes from this passage that Thrasymachus must have been teaching in Athens for several years before this point. A fragment from Clement of Alexandria provides some further context by contrasting Thrasymachus with the Macedonian Archelaus. "And while Euripides says in the Telephus, 'Shall we who are Greeks be slaves to barbarians?', Thrasymachus says in his speech For the People of Larisa, 'Shall we become slaves to Archelaus, Greeks as we are, to a barbarian?'" Rauhut therefore declares it evident that Thrasymachus became most prominent in the last three decades of the 5th century. Dillon and Gergel posit the alternate possibility that the speech was composed by the 2nd-century AD Herodes Atticus, of whom we have extracts similar in spirit to Clement's fragment, which read as authentically 5th-century, exhibiting detailed knowledge of Thessalian politics.

There is a man by the same name mentioned in Aristotle's Politics who overthrew the democracy at Cyme, but nothing is known of this event, nor can it be said with any degree of certainty that they are the same man. Aristotle mentions a Thrasymachus again in his Sophistical Refutations, where he credits him with a pivotal role in the development of rhetorical theory. Quoting the W. A. Pickard-Cambridge text: "For it may be that in everything, as the saying is 'the first start is the main part'... This is in fact what has happened in regard to rhetorical speeches and to practically all the other arts: for those who discovered the beginnings of them advanced them in all only a little way, whereas the celebrities of to-day are the heirs (so to speak) of a long succession of men who have advanced them bit by bit, and so have developed them to their present form, Tisias coming next after the first founders, then Thrasymachus after Tisias, and Theodorus next to him, while several people have made their several contributions to it: and therefore it is not to be wondered at that the art has attained considerable dimensions." Dillon and Gergel are cautious not to read this as stating that this makes Thrasymachus a student of Tisias, just as it does not make Theodorus a student of Thrasymachus.

Writing more specifically in the Rhetoric, Aristotle attributes to Thrasymachus a witty simile. "A simile works best when it is in effect a metaphor, for it is possible to say that a shield is like the drinking-cup of Ares, or that a ruin is like the tattered rag of a house, and to say that Niceratus is like a Philoctetes bitten by Pratys - the simile made by Thrasymachus when he saw Niceratus, who had been beaten by Pratys in a recitation competition, still going around with his hair uncut and unkempt." A further reference to Thrasymachus in the Rhetoric finds Herodicus punning on Thrasymachus' name. "Herodicus said of Thrasymachus, 'You are always bold in battle (thrasymakhos)!'" Dillon and Gergel suggest that this might explain Plato's choice of Thrasymachus as the "combative and bombastic propounder of the 'might is right' theory" for his Republic. Against this theory, however, scholar Angie Hobbs suggests that Thrasymachus's intention may be "simply to expose current hypocrisies, rather than to applaud their manipulation".

Plato mentions Thrasymachus as a successful rhetorician in his Phaedrus, but attributes nothing significant to him. The Byzantine Suda gives a brief description of Thrasymachus affirming his position as a rhetorical theorist. "A Chalcedonian sophist, from the Chalcedon in Bithynia. He was the first to discover period and colon, and he introduced the modern kind of rhetoric. He was a pupil of the philosopher Plato and of the rhetor Isocrates. He wrote deliberative speeches; an Art of Rhetoric; paegnia; Rhetorical Resources." Dillon and Gergel state that the second sentence is a "preposterous statement, both as concerns Plato and Isocrates." They further declare that emending 'pupil' (mathêtês) for 'teacher' (kathêgêtês) is equally foolish. They themselves suggest a lacuna in the text, wherein Thrasymachus is declared the pupil of another, and a rival of Plato and Isocrates.

Dionysius of Halicarnassus praises Thrasymachus for various rhetorical skills in his On Isaeus, finding Thrasymachus "pure, subtle, and inventive and able, according as he wishes, to speak either with terseness or with an abundance of words." But Dionysus found Thrasymachus a second-rate orator beside the "incisive" and "charming" Lysias, because he left no forensic speeches to posterity, only handbooks and display-speeches.

Fragment 1

The essay of Dionysius of Halicarnassus,  On the Style of Demosthenes preserves (as an example of the "middle style") the lengthiest surviving fragment of Thrasymachus' writing. It seems to be "the beginning of a political speech, apparently composed for delivery by a young upper-class Athenian of conservative sympathies" and "was probably composed in the early 420s."

In Plato
Thrasymachus' current importance derives mainly from his being a character in the Republic. He is noted for his unabashed, even reckless, defence of his position and for his famous blush at the end of Book I, after Socrates has tamed him. The meaning of this blush, like that of Socrates' statement in Book 6 that he and Thrasymachus "have just become friends, though we weren't even enemies before" (498c), is a source of some dispute.

There is a long philosophical tradition of exploring what exactly Thrasymachus meant in Republic I, and of taking his statements as a coherent philosophical assertion, rather than as Plato's straw man.

In Republic I, Thrasymachus violently disagreed with the outcome of Socrates' discussion with Polemarchus about justice. Demanding payment before speaking, he claims that "justice is the advantage of the stronger" (338c) and that "injustice, if it is on a large enough scale, is stronger, freer, and more masterly than justice'" (344c). Socrates counters by forcing him to admit that there is some standard of wise rule — Thrasymachus does claim to be able to teach such a thing — and then arguing that this suggests a standard of justice beyond the advantage of the stronger. The rest of the dialogue is occasioned by Glaucon's dissatisfaction with Socrates' refutation.

His name means fierce fighter, which may have influenced his role in the dialogue.

In Leo Strauss's interpretation, Thrasymachus and his definition of justice represent the city and its laws, and thus are in a sense opposed to Socrates and to philosophy in general. As an intellectual, however, Thrasymachus shared enough with the philosopher potentially to act to protect philosophy in the city.

Quotes from Plato's Republic
338c:

340d: 

344c:

References

External links

 Fragments of Thrasymachus, trans. Kathleen Freeman
 Internet Encyclopedia of Philosophy, with bibliographic sources
 Stanford Encyclopedia of Philosophy entry on Callicles and Thrasymachus

Ancient Chalcedonians
5th-century BC Greek people
Sophists
450s BC births
400s BC deaths